The Tavern Keeper's Daughter is a 1908 American silent action film directed by  D. W. Griffith. The film was shot in Fort Lee, New Jersey when many early film studios in America's first motion picture industry were based there at the beginning of the 20th century.

Cast
 George Gebhardt as Mexican
 Edward Dillon as Father
 Florence Auer as Mother
 Marion Leonard as Daughter
 Harry Solter as Old Man
 Marion Sunshine

See also
 D. W. Griffith filmography
 List of American films of 1908

References

External links

1908 films
American silent short films
Films directed by D. W. Griffith
American black-and-white films
Biograph Company films
American action films
1900s action films
Films shot in Fort Lee, New Jersey
1900s English-language films
1900s American films